Roope Laavainen (born 23 August 1998) is a Finnish professional ice hockey defenceman who is currently playing for HPK of the Finnish Liiga. He was selected by the Chicago Blackhawks in the fourth round, 119th overall, of the 2017 NHL Entry Draft.

Playing career
Laavainen played as a youth with Jokerit's U20 team in the Jr. A, prior to his selection to the Blackhawks. He left the Jokerit organization to remain in Finland and sign a three-year contract with HPK of the Liiga on 28 April 2017.

During the 2018–19 season, Laavainen registered 2 points in 10 games with HPK before he was loaned for two months to fellow Liiga club, Mikkelin Jukurit, on 27 November 2018. Adding 1 assist in 5 games with Jukurit, Laavainen returned to HPK on 8 January 2019.

Career statistics

Awards & honors

References

External links

1998 births
Living people
Chicago Blackhawks draft picks
Finnish ice hockey defencemen
HPK players
Ice hockey people from Helsinki
Lempäälän Kisa players
Mikkelin Jukurit players
TuTo players
KooKoo players